Martin Jennison is a former association football player who represented New Zealand at international level.

Jennison played two official A-international matches for the New Zealand in 1988, both World Cup qualifiers against Taiwan, the first a 4–0 win on 12 December, the second three days later a 4–1 win on 12 December 1988.

References

External links

Year of birth missing (living people)
Living people
New Zealand association footballers
New Zealand international footballers

Association footballers not categorized by position